ATM is a 2012 American horror thriller film directed by David Brooks and starring Brian Geraghty, Alice Eve, and Josh Peck. The film centers on three people trapped in an ATM booth by a psychopathic hooded figure.

Plot 
David Hargrove (Brian Geraghty) is a stockbroker having trouble asking out his co-worker Emily Brandt (Alice Eve). At a Christmas party, he offers to drive her home. Reluctantly, he also agrees to drive home his drunk co-worker Corey Thompson (Josh Peck). During the ride, Corey has David stop at a local ATM booth, needing to withdraw cash to buy pizza.

When Corey encounters card problems inside the booth, David and Emily join him inside. The three then spot a hooded figure in a parka coat with the hood up lurking outside in the parking lot. David and Emily suspect the figure to be a robber and discover he cannot enter the booth without an ATM card. When the hooded man kills a dog walker like it's nothing, they attempt to phone the police, but Corey lost his phone at the party, David's phone battery is dead, and Emily's phone is in her purse in the car. The hooded man shuts down the booth's heater. David opts to negotiate their safety by giving the killer $500, earrings, and a watch. He uses this to escape to his car, where he finds out that the vehicle's ignition wires have been severed, and the car cannot start. He attempts to call 911, but is attacked by the man. He accidentally drops Emily's phone as he escapes.

Emily uses her lipstick to write "HELP" on the booth's window to attract attention. The three of them are freezing when a security guard locates them. When the guard tries to call the cops, the hooded man beats him to death using a tire iron from David's car trunk, leaving the three shocked. When a man with a similar coat enters the booth, he is killed by David and Corey, but is revealed to be only an innocent janitor. Frustrated, Corey leaves, ends up hitting a line of wire, falls, and gets stabbed by the hooded man.

After several hours, David and Emily realize Corey is still alive. They retrieve him from outside, narrowly managing to return to the booth before the hooded man can get to them. The man blocks the booth door with David's car and tries to freeze them to death by filling the booth with cold water. Corey dies of blood loss and hypothermia. David lifts Emily on his shoulders to trigger the fire sprinkler system alarm but he slips, causing Emily to fall and fatally break her neck.

The hooded man slams David's car into the booth. Angered, David improvises a Molotov cocktail and throws it at the killer but the figure he sets ablaze turns out to be the dead guard. The police arrive but arrest David as the hooded man hides himself in the crowd. As David is driven away, he sees many figures wearing parkas in the crowd. The police recover surveillance recordings of the events in the ATM booth, but it is made clear that the killer had planned his actions so as not to appear in the footage, miraculously framing David for his crimes. In the final scene, the hooded man returns to his headquarters, where he begins to map out similar attacks on other ATMs.

Cast 
Brian Geraghty as David Hargrove, a stockbroker who seems to have trouble with work, especially when a phone call with his customer "Mr. Dean" ended
Alice Eve as Emily Brandt, David's love-interest and co-worker
Josh Peck as Corey Thompson, David's lazy best friend and other co-worker
 Mike O'Brian as The Man 
 Robert Huculak as Robert
 Ernesto Griffith as Security Guard
 Bryan Clark as Jerry
 Daniel De Jaeger as Luke
 Omar Khan as Christian
 Aaron Hughes as Patrolman
 Will Woytowich as Sargent
 Glen Thompson as Harold

Production 
Filming began September 2010 in Winnipeg, Manitoba. Actress Margarita Levieva was set to play the female lead before being replaced by Alice Eve.

Reception  

On the review aggregator website Rotten Tomatoes, the film has a 12% approval rating, based on 26 reviews with an average rating of 4.06/10.

Release
The film was released to video on demand services such as Comcast and Zune on March 6, 2012. On July 31, 2012, the film was released on DVD and Blu-ray. Both formats feature the 90-minute R-rated  version of the film as well as an 85-minute unrated Director's cut. They also both include a behind-the-scenes featurette and the trailer.

References

External links

 

2012 films
2012 horror films
2012 horror thriller films
2012 independent films
2010s Christmas horror films
2010s serial killer films
American Christmas horror films
American horror thriller films
American independent films
American serial killer films
Films shot in Winnipeg
IFC Films films
Gold Circle Films films
2010s survival films
Films scored by David Buckley
2010s English-language films
2010s American films